W. Metcalfe and Son was a printer and publisher in Cambridge during the 19th and early 20th centuries.  Its office has been located on Green Street, Trinity Street and St Mary's Street.  A large number of books about Cambridge were published by W. Metcalfe and Sons during that era.  In 1836, William Metcalfe was a contender for the printer of Cambridge University Press, but was defeated by John Parker.

The Cambridge General Advertiser, first issued in 1839, was printed by William Metcalfe and Jonathan Palmer.  Metcalfe continued as printer until 1846, after which it changed hands a number of times before closing in 1850.

, W Metcalfe and Sons Ltd is cooperated in Appersett.

Books

The Railway traveller's walk through Cambridge
Editions
 186- - 
 1862 - , Microfilm: 
 1864 - 
 1867 - , Microfilm: 
 1873 - 
 1880 - , Microfilm: 
 1882? - 
 
 

Reprints
 1897 -  (reprint of eight edition)

Others

 
 
 
  Internet Archive
 
 
 
 
 
    Reprinted in 2002 by Adamant Media.

Periodicals
 The Cambridge University Magazine (1839–1842) 
 Cambridge General Advertiser (1839–1846)
 Messenger of Mathematics
 The Eagle (1859–1935).

Annuals

References

Companies with year of establishment missing
Year of disestablishment missing
Defunct companies of the United Kingdom
Book publishing companies of the United Kingdom
Companies based in Cambridge
History of Cambridge